Joshua M. Pearce is an academic engineer at Western University and Michigan Tech known for his work on protocrystallinity, photovoltaic technology, open-source-appropriate technology, and open-source hardware including RepRap 3D printers.

Dr. Pearce received his Ph.D. at The Pennsylvania State University, where his work on protocrystallinity helped develop low-cost amorphous silicon solar photovoltaic technology. His solar research continues. For example, his research group published a levelized cost of electricity study on solar energy showed solar electricity was economically competitive with fossil fuels over wide geographic regions. His research into BDRF modeling of reflectors showed potential solar systems output increases of 30%.

However, he is also a vocal advocate of an open-source approach to technical development. For his work related to open-source nanotechnology, Ars Technica compared him to American software freedom activist Richard Stallman. He applied open-source 3-D printing and electronics to scientific equipment design, where he has claimed both superior innovation and lower costs. Reviewing his book Open-Source Lab, 3-D Printing Industry wrote, "This is a manual that every scientist should read and it holds a message so powerful and disruptive that the Anarchist Cookbook is a fairy tale in comparison."

His research has shown that printing household items with a RepRap is less costly and better for the environment than purchasing conventionally manufactured goods. Similarly, his group developed the recyclebot, a waste plastic extruder, which drops the cost of 3D printing filament from $35/kg to ten cents per kg while making recycling even more environmentally beneficial.

In 2013 his group released an open-source 3D printer capable of printing in steel, which cost less than US$1,200. in order to encourage more rapid technological development according to Scientific American. This cost reduction was significant as the New York Times reported commercial metal printers at the time cost over US$500,000.

He further developed inexpensive methods such as SODIS to disinfect drinking water in the developing world, using sunlight, water bottles, and salt. Recently, the MIT Sloan Management Review reported that Dr. Pearce has combined many of his research areas developing solar powered 3-D printers to drive sustainable development.

Bibliography
Open-Source Lab (book):How to Build Your Own Hardware and Reduce Research Costs (2014)
 David Denkenberger and Joshua Pearce, Feeding Everyone No Matter What: Managing Food Security After Global Catastrophe, Academic Press (2015).

References

Living people
Michigan Technological University faculty
Pennsylvania State University alumni
American materials scientists
Sustainability advocates
21st-century American writers
Open-source hardware people
Year of birth missing (living people)